The 2011–12 Barys Astana season was the Kontinental Hockey League franchise's 4th season of play and 13th season overall.

Standings

Division standings
Source: Kontinental Hockey League Official Website

Conference standings
Source: Kontinental Hockey League Official Website

Divisions: KHA – Kharlamov Division, CHE – Chernyshev Division

Schedule and results

Regular season

|-  style="text-align:center; background:#cfc;"
| 1 || September 14 || Traktor Chelyabinsk || 4-3 || Jeff Glass || Kazakhstan Sports Palace || 4,900 || 1-0-0-0 || 3 || 
|-  style="text-align:center; background:#ffeeaa;"
| 2 || September 16 || Avangard Omsk || 4-5 (SO) || Vitali Yeremeyev || Kazakhstan Sports Palace || 5,200 || 1-0-0-1 || 4 || 
|-  style="text-align:center; background:#fcc;"
| 3 || September 21 || Dynamo Moscow || 3-6 (SO) || Jeff Glass || Luzhniki Minor Arena || 3,000 || 1-1-0-1 || 4 || 
|-  style="text-align:center; background:#cfc;"
| 4 || September 23 || Torpedo Nizhny Novgorod || 1-0 || Jeff Glass || Trade Union Sport Palace || 5,400 || 2-1-0-1 || 7 || 
|-  style="text-align:center; background:#cfc;"
| 5 || September 30 || Metallurg Magnitogorsk || 3-2 || Jeff Glass || Kazakhstan Sports Palace || 5,500 || 3-1-0-1 || 10 || 
|-

|-  style="text-align:center; background:#cfc;"
| 6 || October 2 || Avtomobilist Yekaterinburg || 3-1 || Jeff Glass || Yekaterinburg Sports Palace || 3,500 || 4-1-0-1 || 13 || 
|-  style="text-align:center; background:#fcc;"
| 7 || October 4 || Traktor Chelyabinsk || 3-4 || Jeff Glass || Traktor Ice Arena || 7,000 || 4-2-0-1 || 13 || 
|-  style="text-align:center; background:#fcc;"
| 8 || October 8 || Salavat Yulaev Ufa || 1-2 || Jeff Glass || Kazakhstan Sports Palace || 5,497 || 4-3-0-1 || 13 || 
|-  style="text-align:center; background:#fcc;"
| 9 || October 12 || Dinamo Minsk || 2-5 || Vitali Yeremeyev || Minsk-Arena || 15,046 || 4-4-0-1 || 13 || 
|-  style="text-align:center; background:#fcc;"
| 10 || October 14 || Atlant Moscow Oblast || 0-2 || Vitali Yeremeyev || Mytishchi Arena || 6,300 || 4-5-0-1 || 13 || 
|-  style="text-align:center; background:#cfc;"
| 11 || October 16 || Dinamo Riga || 5-0 || Vitali Yeremeyev || Arena Riga || 8,250 || 5-5-0-1 || 16 || 
|-  style="text-align:center; background:#ffeeaa;"
| 12 || October 18 || SKA Saint Petersburg || 3-4 (SO) || Vitali Yeremeyev || Ice Palace Saint Petersburg || 8,000 || 5-5-0-2 || 17 || 
|-  style="text-align:center; background:#fcc;"
| 13 || October 21 || Yugra Khanty-Mansiysk || 0-7 || Jeff Glass || Kazakhstan Sports Palace	 || 5,107 || 5-6-0-2 || 17 || 
|-  style="text-align:center; background:#fcc;"
| 14 || October 23 || Amur Khabarovsk || 0-4 || Vitali Yeremeyev || Kazakhstan Sports Palace	 || 4,743 || 5-7-0-2 || 17 || 
|-  style="text-align:center; background:#fcc;"
| 15 || October 25 || Amur Khabarovsk || 2-6 || Jeff Glass || Kazakhstan Sports Palace || 3,572 || 5-8-0-2 || 17 || 
|-  style="text-align:center; background:#cfc;"
| 16 || October 27 || Metallurg Novokuznetsk || 3-1 || Vitali Yeremeyev || Kazakhstan Sports Palace || 3,394 || 6-8-0-2 || 20 || 
|-  style="text-align:center; background:#cfc;"
| 17 || October 29 || Sibir Novosibirsk || 3-2 || Vitali Yeremeyev || Kazakhstan Sports Palace || 4,321 || 7-8-0-2 || 23 || 
|-

|-  style="text-align:center; background:#cfc;"
| 18 || November 2 || Neftekhimik Nizhnekamsk || 5-3 || Vitali Yeremeyev || Neftekhimik Ice Palace || 5,000 || 8-8-0-2 || 26 || 
|-  style="text-align:center; background:#cfc;"
| 19 || November 4 || Ak Bars Kazan || 3-2 || Jeff Glass || TatNeft Arena || 7,000 || 9-8-0-2 || 29 || 
|-  style="text-align:center; background:#cfc;"
| 20 || November 6 || Salavat Yulaev Ufa || 4-2 || Jeff Glass || Ufa Arena || 7,950 || 10-8-0-2 || 32 || 
|-  style="text-align:center; background:#fcc;"
| 21 || November 16 || CSKA Moscow || 2-4 || Jeff Glass || Kazakhstan Sports Palace || 4,076 || 10-9-0-2 || 32 || 
|-  style="text-align:center; background:#cfc;"
| 22 || November 18 || Metallurg Novokuznetsk || 3-1 || Vitali Yeremeyev || Kazakhstan Sports Palace || 2,644 || 11-9-0-2 || 35 || 
|-  style="text-align:center; background:#d0e7ff;"
| 23 || November 20 || Lev Poprad || 2-1 (OT) || Vitali Yeremeyev || Kazakhstan Sports Palace || 3,640 || 11-9-1-2 || 37 || 
|-  style="text-align:center; background:#fcc;"
| 24 || November 22 || Dinamo Minsk || 2-6 || Jeff Glass || Kazakhstan Sports Palace || 2,844 || 11-10-1-2 || 37 || 
|-  style="text-align:center; background:#cfc;"
| 25 || November 26 || Spartak Moscow || 4-2 || Jeff Glass || Sokolniki Arena || 1,500 || 12-10-1-2 || 40 || 
|-  style="text-align:center; background:#fcc;"
| 26 || November 28 || Severstal Cherepovets || 1-7 || Jeff Glass || Ice Palace Cherepovets || 3,130 || 12-11-1-2 || 40 || 
|-  style="text-align:center; background:#cfc;"
| 27 || November 30 || Vityaz Chekhov || 6-2 || Jeff Glass || Ice Hockey Center 2004 || 2,500 || 13-11-1-2 || 43 || 
|-

|-  style="text-align:center; background:#cfc;"
| 28 || December 2 || Avtomobilist Yekaterinburg || 8-1 || Jeff Glass || Kazakhstan Sports Palace || 3,037 || 14-11-1-2 || 46 || 
|-  style="text-align:center; background:#cfc;"
| 29 || December 6 || Metallurg Novokuznetsk || 3-2 || Jeff Glass || Kuznetsk Metallurgists Arena || 4,000 || 15-11-1-2 || 49 || 
|-  style="text-align:center; background:#ffeeaa;"
| 30 || December 8 || Sibir Novosibirsk || 3-4 (OT) || Jeff Glass || Ice Sports Palace Sibir || 4,500 || 15-11-1-3 || 50 || 
|-  style="text-align:center; background:#cfc;"
| 31 || December 10 || Amur Khabarovsk || 5-2 || Vitali Yeremeyev || Platinum Arena || 7,100 || 16-11-1-3 || 53 || 
|-  style="text-align:center; background:#fcc;"
| 32 || December 11 || Amur Khabarovsk || 1-7 || Vitali Yeremeyev || Platinum Arena || 7,100 || 16-12-1-3 || 53 || 
|-  style="text-align:center; background:#cfc;"
| 33 || December 23 || Dynamo Moscow || 5-1 || Vitali Yeremeyev || Kazakhstan Sports Palace || 3,401 || 17-12-1-3 || 56 || 
|-  style="text-align:center; background:#fcc;"
| 34 || December 27 || Torpedo Nizhny Novgorod || 0-2 || Vitali Yeremeyev || Kazakhstan Sports Palace || 2,861 || 17-13-1-3 || 56 || 
|-  style="text-align:center; background:#fcc;"
| 35 || December 30 || Salavat Yulaev Ufa || 2-4 || Vitali Yeremeyev || Ufa Arena || 7,950 || 17-14-1-3 || 56 || 
|-

|-  style="text-align:center; background:#cfc;"
| 36 || January 5 || Metallurg Magnitogorsk || 2-1 || Jeff Glass || Magnitogorsk Arena || 7,635 || 18-14-1-3 || 59 || 
|-  style="text-align:center; background:#cfc;"
| 37 || January 7 || Yugra Khanty-Mansiysk || 3-1 || Jeff Glass || Arena Ugra || 4,050 || 19-14-1-3 || 62 || 
|-  style="text-align:center; background:#fcc;"
| 38 || January 9 || Avangard Omsk || 2-4 || Jeff Glass || Omsk Arena || 9,675 || 19-15-1-3 || 62 || 
|-  style="text-align:center; background:#fcc;"
| 39 || January 12 || Sibir Novosibirsk || 1-2 || Jeff Glass || Kazakhstan Sports Palace || 3,227 || 19-16-1-3 || 62 || 
|-  style="text-align:center; background:#cfc;"
| 40 || January 15 || SKA Saint Petersburg || 5-2 || Jeff Glass || Kazakhstan Sports Palace || 5,200 || 20-16-1-3 || 65 || 
|-  style="text-align:center; background:#d0e7ff;"
| 41 || January 17 || Dinamo Riga || 6-5 (SO) || Jeff Glass || Kazakhstan Sports Palace || 3,118 || 20-16-2-3 || 67 || 
|-  style="text-align:center; background:#cfc;"
| 42 || January 19 || Atlant Moscow Oblast || 6-1 || Jeff Glass || Kazakhstan Sports Palace || 3,076 || 21-16-2-3 || 70 || 
|-  style="text-align:center; background:#fcc;"
| 43 || January 24 || Avangard Omsk || 2-3 || Vitali Yeremeyev || Omsk Arena || 8,944 || 21-17-2-3 || 70 || 
|-  style="text-align:center; background:#cfc;"
| 44 || January 26 || Sibir Novosibirsk || 5-0 || Vitali Yeremeyev || Ice Sports Palace Sibir || 3,800 || 22-17-2-3 || 73 || 
|-  style="text-align:center; background:#fcc;"
| 45 || January 28 || Metallurg Novokuznetsk || 0-1 || Vitali Yeremeyev || Kuznetsk Metallurgists Arena || 4,500 || 22-18-2-3 || 73 || 
|-

|-  style="text-align:center; background:#fcc;"
| 46 || February 1 || Salavat Yulaev Ufa || 3-4 || Vitali Yeremeyev || Kazakhstan Sports Palace || 3,835 || 22-19-2-3 || 73 || 
|-  style="text-align:center; background:#fcc;"
| 47 || February 3 || Ak Bars Kazan || 4-6 || Jeff Glass || Kazakhstan Sports Palace || 3,750 || 22-20-2-3 || 73 || 
|-  style="text-align:center; background:#cfc;"
| 48 || February 5 || Neftekhimik Nizhnekamsk || 7-4 || Vitali Yeremeyev || Kazakhstan Sports Palace || 2,834 || 23-20-2-3 || 76 || 
|-  style="text-align:center; background:#fcc;"
| 49 || February 15 || Avangard Omsk || 2-5 || Vitali Yeremeyev || Kazakhstan Sports Palace || 3,923 || 23-21-2-3 || 76 || 
|-  style="text-align:center; background:#fcc;"
| 50 || February 17 || CSKA Moscow || 1-4 || Jeff Glass || CSKA Ice Palace || 2,098 || 23-22-2-3 || 76 || 
|-  style="text-align:center; background:#cfc;"
| 51 || February 19 || Lev Poprad || 3-2 || Vitali Yeremeyev || Poprad Ice Stadium || 4,500 || 24-22-2-3 || 79 || 
|-  style="text-align:center; background:#d0e7ff;"
| 52 || February 22 || Spartak Moscow || 3-2 (OT) || Vitali Yeremeyev || Kazakhstan Sports Palace || 2,962 || 24-22-3-3 || 81 || 
|-  style="text-align:center; background:#ffeeaa;"
| 53 || February 24 || Severstal Cherepovets || 3-4 (SO) || Jeff Glass || Kazakhstan Sports Palace || 2,578 || 24-22-3-4 || 82 || 
|-  style="text-align:center; background:#cfc;"
| 54 || February 26 || Vityaz Chekhov || 3-2 || Vitali Yeremeyev || Kazakhstan Sports Palace || 3,605 || 25-22-3-4 || 85 || 
|-

|-
|

Playoffs

|-  style="text-align:center; background:#fcc;"
| 1 || March 1 || Metallurg Magnitogorsk || 2–3 || Vitali Yeremeyev || Magnitogorsk Arena || 7,259 || 0-1 || 
|-  style="text-align:center; background:#cfc;"
| 2 || March 2 || Metallurg Magnitogorsk || 4–1 || Vitali Yeremeyev || Magnitogorsk Arena || 7,437 || 1-1 || 
|-  style="text-align:center; background:#cfc;"
| 3 || March 4 || Metallurg Magnitogorsk || 3–2 || Vitali Yeremeyev || Kazakhstan Sports Palace || 4,790 || 2-1 || 
|-  style="text-align:center; background:#cfc;"
| 4 || March 5 || Metallurg Magnitogorsk || 4–1 || Vitali Yeremeyev || Kazakhstan Sports Palace || 4,790 || 3-1 || 
|-  style="text-align:center; background:#fcc;"
| 5 || March 7 || Metallurg Magnitogorsk || 3–4 (OT) || Vitali Yeremeyev || Magnitogorsk Arena || 6,519 || 3-2 || 
|-  style="text-align:center; background:#fcc;"
| 6 || March 9 || Metallurg Magnitogorsk || 3–4 (OT) || Vitali Yeremeyev || Kazakhstan Sports Palace || 4,760 || 3-3 || 
|-  style="text-align:center; background:#fcc;"
| 7 || March 11 || Metallurg Magnitogorsk || 1–2 (OT) || Vitali Yeremeyev || Magnitogorsk Arena || 7,653 || 3-4 || 
|-

|-
|

Player statistics
Source: Kontinental Hockey League Official Website

Skaters

Goaltenders

Final roster
Updated March 11, 2012.

|}

Draft picks

Barys Astana's picks at the 2011 KHL Junior Draft in Moscow, Russia at the Mytishchi Arena on May 28, 2011.

See also
2011–12 KHL season

References

Barys Astana seasons
Astana
Barys